Utah wine is made from grapes grown in the U.S. state of Utah. Wine production in Utah from grapes grown there has increased steadily since 2018, despite a generally naive Legislative body which frequently changes the regulations on wine production from legislative session to session.  There are no designated American Viticultural Areas in Utah.

History
The first wine grapes were planted in Utah in the 1860s, soon after the initial settlement of the area by the Mormons.  Viticulture grew to about  under vine, but as the Church of Jesus Christ of Latter-day Saints began to experience an increase in lawlessness and alcoholism its leadership issued new directives effecting wine-making and the wine consumption which eventually led to the abandonment of vineyards, poor quality vines and reduced wine production that was not revived until the late 1970s.  Viticulture is once again on the rise especially in southern Utah.

Vineyards
Beginning in the 1970s some of the first efforts were made to establish vineyards in the Castle Valley, just northeast of Moab Utah in the extreme east/central part of the State. Winemakers planted a few small vineyards near the area of Castle Creek and the Colorado River but never gained a strong foothold in the area mostly due to climate, pests and lack of professional labor to work the vineyards. Despite these struggles, there are still some plantings of Pinot Noir, Merlot, Cabernet Sauvignon, Chenin Blanc and Chardonnay in the area. Today, most of the vineyards in Utah are located in the south western part of the state in Washington County with "the viticultural pioneers" planting at varying elevations in an effort to find the best microclimates in the region. Most of these are planted in traditional French, Italian and Spanish grape varietals. Some viticulturists are planting vineyards in Northern Utah, but due to the colder winters, they are experimenting with Hybrid Grape varietals and finding some success with these grapes.

Utah is an arid and mountainous state with a relatively dry climate making irrigation a requirement for Utah Vineyards.  Almost all the vineyards in the state are planted in bilateral cordons on traditional single or double cross-arm trellises with some vineyards experimenting with modified vertical shoot positioning (VSP) trellises.  VSP styles are more popular in the north where sunburn is not as much a factor; the higher elevations of the southern vineyards make UV intensity a concern, thus making it less popular in the south.  Most of the vineyards throughout the state are planted in different types of alluvium soils that are made up of sandy loam, decomposed Igneous rock, Navajo sandstone and granite. Because of Southern Utah's volcanic and sandstone geology combined with its arid climate the soils are usually low in natural organic compounds making fertilization a regular practice for vineyards in Utah. Presently there is ongoing experimentation with the negative and beneficial impact of adding nitrogen to the soils.  Some research indicates that low nitrogen and low water additions (not to severe levels however) improve the grape quality and the expression of terroir in red grapes while the opposite may be true with white grapes.

Diurnal temperature variations are of particular importance in Utah viticulture and plays a key role in its success. Due to the elevations of the vineyards and their frequent locations adjacent to mountain slopes, the daily average diurnal is as high as 16.5 °C (30 °F) in a day.  In grapes, this variation has the effect of producing high acid and high sugar content.  This is because a grapes' exposure to sunlight increases the ripening qualities allowing for more sugar production, while the drop in temperature at night preserves the balance of natural acids in the grape. The elevations and the associated UV exposure also cause the grapes to grow thick skins to protect the fruit which in turn creates wines of intense color and robust tannins.

Industry
Despite its infancy, winemakers in Utah have quickly figured out how to produce fine wines from 100% Utah grapes.  They are utilizing many of the most popular winemaking techniques including native and non-native yeast fermentation, carbonic maceration, oak barrel aging and many others. The red wines are robust, colorful and aromatic but differ from other southwestern wines in that they do not present the gypsum flavors frequently found in wine regions such as Arizona and Temecula California. Winemakers are discovering that varietals such as Merlot, Tempranillo, Sangiovese, Cabernet Sauvignon, Syrah, Malbec and Carignan are especially suited for this area. Merlot grown in the Washington County seems to hold significant potential as it has recently been rated higher than some prestigious Napa California producers in American wine competitions.  In 2021, Utah's most experienced winemaker was selling out of his Utah Cabernet Sauvignon, at $100 per bottle, representing the first time in the states history that 100% Utah wine entered that extremely prestigious class of ultra-premium wines.  Due to the elevation of its vineyards, Utah red wines are intense and dark and winemakers must work to soften the natural tannins produced here.  One approach to this challenge is to separate free-run and press run wines and blend back as appropriate.  Pinot Noir is being tested by numerous winemakers who so far are finding that, while it grows quite vigorously, producing a lighter style of this wine is challenging due to the intensity of fruit produced in southern Utah.

In the area of white wine production, winemakers are finding success with Chardonnay, Malvasia, Verdejo, Semillion and Muscat.  The significant diurnal of the vineyards makes it possible to produce high alcohol/high acid white wines giving these varietals excellent mouthfeel and fruit components while allowing a crispness often preferred by white wine drinkers.  Tests on barreled aged chardonnay are underway and showing real promise as are some limited production of Ramato style Pinot Grigio wines.

See also
American wine

References

External links
 
 Moab Area Wineries

Wine regions of the United States by state
Tourism in Utah
Agriculture in Utah